The Shammo (Shammɔ) or Jere languages are spoken in north-central Nigeria. They form a subgroup within the East Kainji languages.

A common greeting, Shammɔ, is used in all of the Shammo languages.

Languages
Shammɔ languages
Zele cluster
Zele (Jere)
Boze (Buji), Panawa (Bujiyel)
Sanga, Gusu, Moro
Loro, Bunu (Ribina)
? Tunzu (Duguza)

References

Further reading
Gunn, H.D. 1953. Peoples of the Plateau Area of Northern Nigeria. IAI, London.
Nengel, J.G. 1999. Precolonial African intergroup relations in the Kauru and Pengana polities of Central Nigerian Highlands, 1800-1900. Frankfurt am Main: Peter Lang.
Nengel, J.G. 2019. A history of the Boze polity of Plateau State, Nigeria. Ilishan-Remo, Nigeria: Babcock University Press.
Shimizu, Kiyoshi 1968. An outline of the I-búnú noun class system. Department of Linguistics and Nigerian Languages, Ibadan University.
Shimizu, Kiyoshi 1975. The language groups in and around Benue-Plateau State. mimeo. Centre for the Study of Nigerian Languages, Kano.
Shimizu, Kiyoshi 1980. Five wordlists with analyses from the Northern Jos Group of Plateau Languages. Afrika und Übersee, 62:4.253-271.
Shimizu, Kiyoshi 1982a. Ten more wordlists with analyses from the Northern Jos Group of Plateau Languages. Afrika und Übersee, 65:1.97-134.
Shimizu, Kiyoshi 1982b. Die Nord-Jos-Gruppe der Plateausprachen Nigerias. Afrika und Übersee, 65(2):161-210.
Temple, Olive 1922. Notes on the Tribes, Provinces, Emirates and States of the Northern Provinces of Nigeria. Argus Printing and Publishing Co. Cape Town.